Cyperus exaltatus is a species of sedge that is native to parts of the Africa, Asia, Argentina and Australia.

See also 
 List of Cyperus species

References 

exaltatus
Plants described in 1788
Taxa named by Anders Jahan Retzius
Flora of Argentina
Flora of China
Flora of India
Flora of New South Wales
Flora of Queensland
Flora of Victoria (Australia)
Flora of the Northern Territory
Flora of South Australia
Flora of Angola
Flora of Bangladesh
Flora of Benin
Flora of Burkina Faso
Flora of Cameroon
Flora of Chad
Flora of Ethiopia
Flora of Ivory Coast
Flora of Japan
Flora of Java
Flora of Kenya
Flora of Korea
Flora of Peninsular Malaysia
Flora of Mali
Flora of Mozambique
Flora of Nepal
Flora of New Guinea
Flora of Nigeria
Flora of Pakistan
Flora of Senegal
Flora of Seychelles
Flora of Somalia
Flora of Sri Lanka
Flora of Sudan
Flora of Taiwan
Flora of Thailand
Flora of Tanzania
Flora of Togo
Flora of Uganda
Flora of Vietnam
Flora of Zimbabwe